Poplar Eyot or Poplar Ait is an island in the River Thames in England near the villages of Shiplake, Oxfordshire and Wargrave, Berkshire. It is on the reach above Marsh Lock.

The island is wooded and only accessible by boat. It has immediately downstream much less pronounced and smaller wooded islets, which are submerged when the river is in spate after major rainfall or snow melt across the catchment); they lie below the grounds of buildings Bolney Court and Thames Side Court which have formal geometric landscaped gardens on the Shiplake bank, and it has always been part of the parish since its medieval founding; though is slightly closer to the Wargrave bank.

See also

Islands in the River Thames

References

Islands of Oxfordshire
Islands of Berkshire
Islands of the River Thames